Todd Morgan Beamer (November 24, 1968 – September 11, 2001) was an American passenger aboard United Airlines Flight 93, which was hijacked and crashed as part of the September 11 attacks in 2001. He was one of the passengers who attempted to regain control of the aircraft from the hijackers. During the struggle, the Boeing 757 lost control and crashed into a field in Stonycreek Township near Shanksville, Pennsylvania, killing everyone on board, but saving the hijackers' intended target and additional victims.

Biography
Todd Beamer was born on November 24, 1968, in Flint, Michigan, to David Beamer, an IBM sales representative, and Peggy Jackson Beamer, a muralist, the middle child of three and only son. Beamer and his two sisters, Melissa and Michele, were raised "with a strong biblical value system and work ethic". The family relocated to Poughkeepsie, New York, and then to Wheaton, Illinois, a suburb west of Chicago, where David worked at Amdahl, a computer technology company.

Beamer attended Wheaton Christian Grammar School, where he played soccer, basketball, and baseball. He attended Wheaton Academy, a Christian high school, from 1983 to 1985, where he excelled in the same sports. He was elected class vice president in his junior year. After David was promoted to vice president of Amdahl's California headquarters, the family moved, and Beamer spent his senior year at Los Gatos High School, southwest of San Jose, California.

Beamer attended California State University, Fresno, where he majored in physical therapy and played baseball, in the hopes of playing professionally, but injuries he suffered in an automobile accident ended these plans. He returned home to Illinois and transferred to Wheaton College, a Christian liberal arts college. At Wheaton College he majored initially in medicine before switching to business. He continued to play baseball and as a senior became captain of the basketball team. He graduated in 1991.

While at Wheaton College, he met Lisa Brosious, his future wife, during a senior seminar class. Their first date was November 2, 1991, the 10-year anniversary of which they had been planning to celebrate at the time of his death.

Beamer subsequently worked for Wilson Sporting Goods while taking night classes at
DePaul University, earning an M.B.A. in June 1993.

Beamer married Brosious on May 14, 1994, in Peekskill, New York, and they moved to Plainsboro, New Jersey, where Beamer began working with Oracle Corporation, selling systems applications and database software as a field marketing representative. Within months, Beamer was promoted to account manager.

Beamer and Lisa taught Sunday school at Princeton Alliance Church for six years, and worked in youth ministry. Beamer also played on the church softball team. He was a staunch fan of the Chicago Cubs, Chicago Bulls and Chicago Bears. In 2000, the Beamers moved to Cranbury, New Jersey, with their two sons.

Flight 93

Beamer's work required him to travel up to four times a month, sometimes for as long as a week. In 2001, he earned a five-day trip to Italy with his wife for being a top sales performer. They returned home on Monday, September 10, at 5:00 pm EDT. Although Beamer could have left that night for a Tuesday business meeting in California, he opted instead to spend time with his pregnant wife, who was due with their third child the following January. He left home at 6:15 am the next morning, to take an early flight from Newark to San Francisco to meet with representatives of the Sony Corporation at 1:00 pm, planning to return on a red-eye flight that night.

United Flight 93 was scheduled to depart at 8:00 am, but the Boeing 757 did not depart until 42 minutes later due to runway traffic delays. Four minutes later, American Airlines Flight 11 crashed into the World Trade Center's North Tower. At 9:03 am, 17 minutes later, as United Airlines Flight 175 crashed into the South Tower, United 93 was climbing to cruising altitude, heading west over New Jersey and into Pennsylvania. At 9:25 am, Flight 93 was above eastern Ohio, and its pilot radioed Cleveland controllers to inquire about an alert that had been flashed on his cockpit computer screen to "beware of cockpit intrusion." Three minutes later, Cleveland controllers could hear screams over the cockpit's open microphone. Moments later, the hijackers, led by the Lebanese Ziad Samir Jarrah, took over the plane's controls, disengaged the autopilot, and told passengers, "Keep remaining sitting [sic]. We have a bomb on board." Beamer and the other passengers were herded into the back of the plane. Within six minutes, the plane changed course and was heading for Washington, D.C.

Several of the passengers made phone calls to loved ones, who informed them about the two planes that had crashed into the World Trade Center in New York City and the third into the Pentagon in Arlington County, Virginia. Beamer tried to place a credit card call through a phone located on the back of a plane seat, but was routed to a customer-service representative, who passed him on to GTE airphone supervisor Lisa Jefferson. With FBI agents listening in on their call, Beamer informed Jefferson that hijackers had taken over United 93, and that one passenger had been killed. He also stated that two of the hijackers had knives, and that one appeared to have a bomb strapped around his waist. When the hijackers veered the plane sharply south, Beamer exclaimed, "We're going down! We're going down!"

Following this, the passengers and flight crew decided to act. According to accounts of cell phone conversations, Beamer, along with Mark Bingham, Tom Burnett, and Jeremy Glick, formed a plan to take the plane back from the hijackers. They were joined by other passengers, including Lou Nacke, Rich Guadagno, Alan Beaven, Honor Elizabeth Wainio, Linda Gronlund, and William Cashman, along with flight attendants Sandra Bradshaw and CeeCee Lyles, in discussing their options and voting on a course of action, ultimately deciding to storm the cockpit and take over the plane. Beamer told Jefferson that the group was planning to "jump on" the hijackers and fly the plane into the ground before the hijackers' plan could be followed through. Beamer recited the Lord's Prayer and the 23rd Psalm with Jefferson, prompting others to join in. Beamer requested of Jefferson, "If I don't make it, please call my family and let them know how much I love them." After this, Jefferson heard muffled voices and Beamer clearly answering, "Are you ready? Okay. Let's roll." These were the last words spoken by Beamer heard by Lisa Jefferson.

According to the 9/11 Commission Report, after the plane's voice data recorder was recovered, it revealed pounding and crashing sounds against the cockpit door and shouts and screams in English. "Let's get them!" a passenger cries. A hijacker shouts, "Allahu akbar." Jarrah repeatedly pitched the plane to knock passengers off their feet, but the passengers continued their assault and at 10:02:17, a male passenger said, "Turn it up!" A second later, a hijacker said, "Pull it down! Pull it down!" At 10:02:33, Jarrah was heard to plead, "Hey! Hey! Give it to me. Give it to me. Give it to me. Give it to me. Give it to me. Give it to me. Give it to me. Give it to me." The plane was 20 minutes of flying time away from its suspected target, the White House or the U.S. Capitol Building in Washington, D.C. According to Vice President Dick Cheney, President George W. Bush had given an order to shoot the plane down had it continued its path to Washington.

Legacy

Beamer was survived by his wife, Lisa, their sons, David and Andrew (known as "Drew"), who were three and one at the time of Beamer's death, and their daughter Morgan. In an address to a joint session of Congress and the American people on September 20, 2001, which Lisa Beamer attended, President Bush praised the courage of United 93's passengers, naming Beamer in particular, whom he called "an exceptional man." In a November 8 address from the World Congress Center in Atlanta, Georgia, Bush would invoke Beamer's last-heard words, saying in his speech, "Some of our greatest moments have been acts of courage for which no one could have been prepared. But we have our marching orders. My fellow Americans, let's roll!" He would use them again in the 2002 State of the Union address: "For too long our culture has said, 'If it feels good, do it.' Now America is embracing a new ethic and a new creed: 'Let's roll.'"

Beamer's daughter, Morgan Kay, was born January 9, 2002, four months after Beamer's death. The President and First Lady Laura Bush were among those who sent letters to Morgan upon her birth.

A nonprofit foundation was founded in October 2001 to counsel traumatized children of 9/11 victims and survivors. Beamer's best friend, Doug Macmillan, quit his job to become the administrator of the Foundation.

In 2002, Beamer's widow, Lisa, wrote a book with coauthor Ken Abraham, Let's Roll! Ordinary People, Extraordinary Courage.

In 2002, the passengers of Flight 93, including Beamer, were posthumously awarded the Arthur Ashe Courage Award.

The Cranbury, New Jersey post office was dedicated to Beamer on May 4, 2002, as a result of an Act of Congress authored by Congressman Rush D. Holt, Jr. The bill was signed into law by President George W. Bush.

In 2003, Wheaton College honored Beamer, an alumnus, by opening the Todd M. Beamer Center, which encompasses Anderson Commons, Coray Alumni Gym and the Student Center located on the lower level. That same year, Todd Beamer High School opened in Federal Way, Washington.

In February 2010, the city of Fresno, California dedicated Todd Beamer Park.

The Flight 93 National Memorial located at the crash site in Stonycreek Township includes a concrete and glass visitor center, and a white marble Wall of Namescompleted in 2011on which Beamer's name and those of his 32 fellow passengers and seven crewmembers are engraved on individual panels.

At the National 9/11 Memorial, Beamer and the other passengers and crew of Flight 93 are memorialized at the South Pool, on Panel S-68. An Oracle business card bearing Beamer's name and his two-tone Rolex Oyster Perpetual Datejust wristwatch, both of which were found damaged at the crash site, are on display inside the memorial museum.

On September 10, 2013, Wheaton Academy honored Beamer by unveiling a plaque dedicated to him on the grounds of the Academy, next to a plaque of a former student who was killed in Afghanistan.

To honor Beamer on the 20th anniversary of the September 11 attacks, fellow DePaul University alumnus Nicholas Hahn, III created the Todd M. Beamer Memorial Scholarship to educate and inspire DePaul students about Beamer's heroic example.

In popular culture
Beamer is portrayed by David Alan Basche in the film United 93, and by Brennan Elliott in the TV film Flight 93.

Beamer is featured in two panels within The Amazing Spider-Man volume 2#36, in which he ends his phone call with Lisa Jefferson before storming the cockpit. Spider-Man refers to the passengers of Flight 93 as "Ordinary men. Ordinary women. Refusing to surrender."

The Neil Young song "Let's Roll", written in the aftermath of the attacks, is a tribute to Beamer sung from his perspective.

References

External links

 Photos of the Cranbury Post Office dedication 
  – cenotaph at the Flight 93 National Memorial, Shanksville, Pennsylvania
  – gravesite in Brainerd Cemetery, Cranbury, New Jersey

1968 births
2001 deaths
American evangelicals
American terrorism victims
DePaul University alumni
Male murder victims
Members of the Christian and Missionary Alliance
People from Cranbury, New Jersey
People from Flint, Michigan
United Airlines Flight 93 victims
Wheaton College (Illinois) alumni
People murdered in Pennsylvania
Terrorism deaths in Pennsylvania
Victims of aviation accidents or incidents in the United States